ke
The list of shipwrecks in 1966 includes ships sunk, foundered, grounded, or otherwise lost during 1966.

January

2 January

4 January

6 January

10 January

13 January

14 January

20 January

21 January

22 January

23 January

Unknown date

February

1 February

7 February

16 February

20 February

20 February

25 February

27 February

Unknown date

March

2 March

4 March

11 March

12 March

16 March

19 March

23 March

April

3 April

8 April

12 April

13 April

14 April

19 April

21 April

26 April

26 April

May

7 May

10 May

11 May

17 May

18 May

24 May

26 May

28 May

30 May

Unknown date

June

1 June

2 June

6 June

8 June

10 June

16 June

19 June

25 June

26 June

28 June

29 June

July

1 July

2 July

3 July

5 July

8 July

10 July

11 July

13 July

17 July

25 July

27 July

28 July

30 July

31 July

August

2 August

8 August

10 August

11 August

14 August

23 August

27 August

Unknown date

September

1 September

3 September

7 September

11 September

12 September

13 September

14 September

15 September

18 September

19 September

20 September

25 September

26 September

29 September

October

1 October

2 October

12 October

15 October

16 October

18 October

23 October

24 October

Unknown date

November

1 November

3 November

5 November

8 November

10 November

11 November

13 November

14 November

16 November

17 November

19 November

20 November

25 November

27 November

28 November

29 November

30 November

Unknown date

December

1 December

8 December

11 December

12 December

15 December

18 December

30 December

31 December

Unknown date

References

1966
 
Ships